Sabina Pehić is a Bosnian retired professional footballer and handballer who played for both the Bosnia and Herzegovina women's national football team and the Bosnia and Herzegovina women's national handball team.

In football she played as a forward. By the end of 2006 Pehić had scored 26 goals in a record 38 appearances for the national football team. When she retired from the national football team she had earned over 100 caps.

In the 2000-01 season she won the football and handball league titles with her club Bugojno. She played her handball for clubs in Croatia, Germany and Bosnia and Herzegovina. In 2006 she played handball for ŽRK Željeznicar from Hadžići. Her club football she then played in Zagreb, for ŽNK Dinamo-Maksimir. In handball, she won four league titles in a row with Borac. She also won trophies with Galeb and Iskra. In 2018 at the age of 44 she made a comeback in handball, scoring nine goals for her club Neretva, where she is the coach. She also is a football coach, coaching the Bosnia and Herzegovina under-17s.

References

Living people
1974 births
Bosnia and Herzegovina women's international footballers
Bosnia and Herzegovina female handball players
Women's association football forwards
Bosnia and Herzegovina women's footballers